Kruft is a municipality in the district of Mayen-Koblenz in Rhineland-Palatinate, western Germany.

It is home to Laach Castle, a burgstall and former spur castle by the Laacher See lake.

References

Municipalities in Rhineland-Palatinate
Mayen-Koblenz